The Fairground Park Riot was a race riot that broke out on June 21, 1949, at a newly integrated public swimming pool.  The Fairground Park pool was located near Natural Bridge and Vandeventer Avenues in north St. Louis.

History 

The Fairground Pool, in St. Louis, Missouri, was one of the largest pools in the American Midwest measuring 440 feet. The pool was able to hold from 10,000 to 12,000 swimmers at a time. During this time period much of the country was suffering from segregation, particularly Missouri. Pickets had been put up at the Fairground Park to protest the segregation of pools despite the lack of support for segregation of public facilities in federal law. John J. O'Toole, City of St. Louis' Director of Public Welfare made the decision to desegregate the pool saying, "I can't oppose anyone from lawfully using a swimming pool. They are taxpayers and citizens, too." On June 21, 1949, African Americans were allowed access to the city pool for the first time. Until that day, the Fairground Park swimming pool was only open to white patrons. On the first day that it was open to African Americans too, only 30 to 40 African Americans showed up. They swam alongside white children without any problem until a group of white teenagers surrounded the fence that enclosed the pool and began to shout threats to the African American swimmers. The black children had to be taken to a changing room until they could be escorted out by police. Some eyewitness reports contradict each other some saying that the children were not placed in harm's way, while others say that the police escorts did not stop the white teenagers from physically attacking the black children. Some witnesses reported that by 6:45 p.m. that day the crowd escalated to several hundred and of those people only 20 to 30 were African American. The riot escalated rapidly when a rumor got around that a black man had killed a white man. The black boys were surrounded by the white boys who had arrived with baseball bats. It appeared that one of the boys even had a knife. One of the African American children was beat until an officer fell on top of him to stop the white child from attacking him.  By now, the crowd had turned into thousands. Approximately 150 police officers were at the scene. By 10 o'clock that night, the situation mellowed down; however, the crowd did not fully disappear until after midnight. To avoid another eruption, the mayor decided that the best decision would be to segregate the pools again. Ultimately, in 1950, it was ordered by the federal court to integrate the pools of St. Louis.

Through Robert Gammon's & J.C. Tobias' Eyes 
When the race riot occurred, Robert Gammon was only a teenager. All he wanted to do was cool down at the Fairground Park swimming pool. Sixty years later, he can still remember the fear he endured. He remembers the taunts, the bricks, and the fights. When he heard the radio announcement that the pool would be open for blacks as well, he did not think it would cause such backlash. For the longest time, all he wanted to do was swim in the outdoor pool that had the wooden diving platform. However, he had never experienced such fear as he did when he headed home that night. When he, along with the other black kids, were escorted to the changing room, he remembers a white woman spitting at him. Once the police escorts separated, Gammon and his friends were chased by whites to St. Louis Avenue before giving up. He even recalls one of his friends getting hit in the head by a brick that was thrown at him. After the riot, he felt that it would be a long time before he could trust white people again. He said, "I thought all white people hated us." To this day Gammon cannot understand why the riot happened. He wonders, "Just because I'm black?" He remembers the crowds continuing to get larger and larger as the day went on and more fights kept breaking out. Time magazine published an article about the riot in the days following  and described the scene as, "Negro boys were chased and beaten by white gangs. In the gathering dusk, one grown-up rabble-rouser spoke out. 'Want to know how to take care of those niggers?' he shouted. 'Get bricks. Smash their heads, the dirty, filthy "-".'"  Years late,  Gammon visited the Fairground Park and leaned against the fence that once had enclosed the original pool. As the years have gone by, he does not see race the same way. He does not continue to hold the belief that all whites hate him; however, he does wish that the whole incident would have never happened. In his eyes, he sees things are better nowadays, but the issue is still prevalent and there is still progress to be made.  J.C. Tobias recalls being chased by a mob of white teenagers when he and some friends were walking back home from the park's baseball diamond. He said, "When you're a kid, you don't think much about it. As you age, you realize it didn't make much sense. We were just up there to swim." J.C. Tobias was just a teenager when the riot occurred and sixty years later he still has a vivid recollection of the event.

The Other Side 
Star-Times' also made a report about the riot. The report included what one middle-aged man at the riot said. According to the report, the man said, "Kill a nigger and make a name for yourself," the other man said. "Kill the black bastards." Star Times' even included a photograph of white mothers carrying their young children along with them to miss the excitement. White teenagers went around with their weapons. They carried with them baseball bats and broom sticks. One reporter stated that they overheard one of the white teenagers say, "This is a waiting party. Waiting until it gets dark," and another white teenager replied with, "I'll kill the bastards." Someone from the crowd spotted some African Americans and shouted, "There's some niggers!" Like a swarm of ants, the proceeded towards the African American boys and surrounded them. They saw an African American boy pull a knife and they began to attack him. They used their clubs, bats, sticks, and their fist to attack the young boy. Despite police effort to protect the boy, the whites continued to attack him as he laid on the ground.

Forgotten history 
In Eddie Silva's, "The Longest Day," he shares his feeling about the race riot and believes that the race riot "has been erased from the city's collective memory." This part of history is overlooked and not talked about because it forces the people to confront the city's racial divisions. Silva believes that ignoring the riot does not change that fact that it happened and it is something that needs receive the attention it deserves because its effects still continue currently. Some choose to forget or not believe that on the night of the riot approximately 4,000 to 5,000 whites roamed the grounds of the Fairground Park and assaulted any and every African American that crossed their path.

Aftermath 
The riot lasted a total of twelve hours, requiring nearly four hundred police officers to restore order. In total, there were over a dozen people injured and at least eight were arrested in connection to the riot. No deaths resulted in the melee, however, ten black people and two white people were hospitalized for injuries sustained in the event. Official reports state that out of the seven people that were arrested that day, three were white and four were black. Of those seven however, three blacks and one white were ultimately arrested and charged with initiating the riot. Attendance at the Fairground Park Pool dropped so significantly that it could no longer turn a profit and ultimately was closed down.

See also
Fairground Park
 List of incidents of civil unrest in the United States

External links 
 The Fairgrounds Park Riot
 The Fairgrounds Park Incident (1949 report)

Bibliography  
The Atlantic. Atlantic Media Company, n.d. Web. 25 Oct. 2016.

By 6:45 P.m., a Crowd of Several Hundred Had Gathered, Some 20 to 30 of Whom Were

Blacks. White Boys with Baseball Bats Surrounded a Group of Black Boys, and Beat One of the  African American Youths until a Police Officer Fell on Top of the Victim to Stop. "June 21, 1949 – Race Riot Over Pool Integration in St. Louis, Missouri." Legal Legacy. N.p., 21 June 2016. Web. 27 Oct. 2016.

BY Phillip O'Connor Poconnor@post-dispatch.com 314-340-8321. "Pool Riot Pivotal in Race

Relations City's Decision in '49 to Integrate Swimming Pools Sparked Violence That Triggered Change." Stltoday.com. N.p., 30 Aug. 2014. Web. 25 Oct. 2016.

Silva, Eddie. "The Longest Day." Riverfront Times. N.p., n.d. Web. 25 Oct. 2016.

References 

African-American history in St. Louis
American culture
Cultural studies
History of racial segregation in the United States
History of St. Louis
Racially motivated violence in the United States
1949 riots
1949 in Missouri
June 1949 events in the United States
1949 crimes in the United States